The Crossroads of America is the official motto of the U.S. state of Indiana. Various cities in the Midwestern United States also use the phrase or a variant thereof to describe their location.

Adoption

The Indiana General Assembly passed a resolution in 1937 establishing the phrase as the state's official motto.

Use
In the early days of cross-country travel by horse and wagon, Terre Haute, Indiana, benefited by its location on the old National Road between Indianapolis and Vandalia, Illinois. The National Road was later named U.S. Highway 40 when it became a U.S. Highway in 1926. At the same time, US 41 was commissioned between Chicago, Illinois, and Miami, Florida. This north–south highway through downtown Terre Haute followed Seventh Street at the time, and met US 40, which followed Wabash Avenue, the main east–west street in town. The Seventh and Wabash intersection thus became known as the "Crossroads of America", an appellation now memorialized with a historical marker at that corner.

Indianapolis, the state capital, is also unofficially nicknamed the Crossroads of America, due to its central location at the junction of four major Interstate Highways: Interstate 65, Interstate 69, Interstate 70, and Interstate 74.

Vandalia, Ohio, has also been called the Crossroads of America because US 40 and the eastern division of the Dixie Highway crossed in the middle of the town.

Schererville, Indiana, uses the motto "Crossroads of the Nation" to describe the intersection of U.S. Route 30 and U.S. Route 41 in the center of town. Much of US 30 was originally the Lincoln Highway, one of the first cross country highways in America. US 41 was once one of the most traveled roads from the Midwestern United States to the Southern United States.

Wentzville, Missouri, uses the motto "Crossroads of the Nation" as well to describe the intersection of I-70 and U.S. 40.

See also
List of Indiana state symbols
List of U.S. state and territory mottos

References

Transportation in Indiana
Indiana culture
Symbols of Indiana